The Jamaica Classic (branded as the Jersey Mike's Jamaica Classic) is an early-season college basketball tournament that takes place in November of each year at the Montego Bay Convention Centre in Montego Bay, Jamaica. Each year, Jamaica Classic participants play games at campus sites in the United States, some before and some after the Montego Bay games. At Montego Bay, those which host the campus-site games play in the "Montego Bay Division" of the Classic, while those which visit the hosts for campus-site games play separately in the "Rose Hall Division." A separate championship is awarded for each division, and a most valuable player is selected in each division.

Games played at the Montego Bay Convention Centre are televised on the CBS Sports Network.

History

The tournament debuted in 2017 with a 14-team field taking part in campus-site games. Seven of the 14 teams traveled to Montego Bay, where the Montego Bay Division played in a four-team showcase format, with predetermined match-ups scheduled as two doubleheaders. The Rose Hall Division had only three teams, which each played each other once in a three-day round-robin format. This resulted in a tripleheader on the first day at Montego Bay, a lone Rose Hall Division game on the second day, and another tripleheader on the third day.

In 2018, eight teams participated. All traveled to Montego Bay, where each division played in a four-team showcase format, with predetermined match-ups scheduled as two doubleheaders over two days. This resulted in two days of competition with four games on each day (one doubleheader for each division), separated by an off day.

In 2019, ten teams took part in campus-site games, eight of them NCAA Division I teams. The eight Division I teams traveled to Montego Bay, where play took place using the same format as in 2018.

The 2020 edition of the tournament was canceled because of the COVID-19 pandemic, which prompted the National Collegiate Athletic Association (NCAA) to move the first contest date of college basketball for the 2020–2021 season to November 25, 2020. With the pandemic still raging in 2021, the 2021 tournament also was cancelled, and the competition for that year shifted to a new tournament, the Jersey Mike's Classic, in St. Petersburg, Florida.

The Jamaica Classic resumed competition in 2022 and introduced bracketed tournament play for the first time, with separate brackets for each division. As in 2018 and 2019, four games — two from each division — were played on each of two days, resulting in four games on each of the two days with an off-day in between. The 2022 Classic also reduced the number of campus-site games to four.

Champions
SOURCES

Montego Bay Division
2022 — Loyola Marymount
2021 — No tournament
2020 — No tournament
2019 — Utah State
2018 — Loyola Marymount
2017 — Florida State

Rose Hall Division
2022 — Queens
2021 — No tournament
2020 — No tournament
2019 — Eastern Michigan
2018 — Campbell
2017 — Hartford

Most Valuable Players
SOURCESReid, Paula, "Utah State Beat Back Challenge of North Texas at Jamaica Classic," Daily Observer (Jamaica), November 26, 2019.Twitter Jersey Mike's Jamaica Classic Accessed 22 November 2022

Montego Bay Division
2022 — Chance Stephens, Loyola Marymount
2021 — No tournament
2020 — No Tournament
2019 — Justin Bean, Utah State
2018 — James Batemon III, Loyola Marymount
2017 — M. J. Walker, Florida State

Rose Hall Division
2022 — Jay'Den Turner, Queens
2021 — No tournament
2020 — No tournament
2019 — Noah Morgan, Eastern Michigan
2018 — Chris Clemens, Campbell
2017 — J. R. Lynch, Hartford

Tournaments

2022
After a three-year hiatus, the Jamaica Classic resumed play in 2022, featuring a new format. In addition to campus games, the 2022 event included a tournament featuring two brackets, the first time the Jamaica Classic included bracketed tournament play.

Eight teams took part in the Jamaica Classic. Each participant played a game at a campus site in the United States, either before or after the tournament at Montego Bay. Play at Montego Bay was divided into the Montego Bay Division, a bracketed competition including the four teams which had hosted a campus-site game, and the Rose Hall Division, a separate bracketed competition made up of the four teams which played as the visitor in a campus-site game. The tournament took place over the course of two days, with two Montego Bay Division and two Rose Hall Division games each day and an off day in between. Championship and consolation games in each bracket determined the results in each division.

Participants 
 Georgetown
 Green Bay
 La Salle
 Loyola Marymount
 Morgan State
 Queens
 Utah Valley
 Wake Forest

Campus games

Montego Bay Division

Rose Hall Division

2021
The 2021 Jamaica Classic was cancelled due to the COVID-19 pandemic. Instead, a new tournament, the Jersey Mike's Classic, was founded, played in the McArthur Center at Eckerd College in St. Petersburg, Florida. The Jamaica Classic competition was shifted to the Jersey Mike's Classic for the season, with Ball State, FIU, Green Bay, UMass, UNC Greensboro, and Weber State participating.

2020
The 2020 Jamaica Classic was cancelled due to the COVID-19 pandemic. Teams which committed to participate included UMass, Missouri State, UNC Greensboro, and Wake Forest.

2019
The 2019 Jamaica Classic had ten participants, eight of them NCAA Division I teams. All campus-site games took place before the Montego Bay tournament, with some teams playing in two campus-site games and others in only one. The eight Division I teams then traveled to Montego Bay, where play followed the format established in 2018 of a four-team showcase-style event in the Montego Bay Division made up of teams which strictly had hosted campus-site games, and a similar four-team showcase-style event in the Rose Hall Division, which consisted of the teams which played against the "host" teams as visitors at campus sites.

Participants 
 Eastern Michigan
 LSU
 Michigan–Dearborn
 Nicholls
 North Carolina A&T
 North Texas
 Rhode Island
 St. Mary's (MD)
 Utah State
 UMBC

Campus Games

Montego Bay Division

Rose Hall Division 

Source

2018
The 2018 Jamaica Classic had eight participants. Each team played in two campus-site games, some played before and some after the Montego Bay event. Four teams played strictly as hosts in the campus-site games and the other four strictly as visitors.

All eight teams traveled to Montego Bay, where the four teams which hosted campus-site games made up the Montego Bay Division and the four which had played as visitors at campus sites made up the Rose Hall Division. Each division played in a two-day showcase-like format with predetermined match-ups on both days of competition. Two Montego Bay Division and two Rose Hall Division games took place on each day, with an off-day in between.

Participants 
 Austin Peay
 Campbell
 Central Connecticut
 Florida A&M
 Georgetown
 Loyola Marymount
 Ohio
 South Florida

Campus games

Montego Bay Division

Rose Hall Division 

Source

2017
Fourteen teams — 10 NCAA Division I and four non-Division I teams — participated in the 2017 Jamaica Classic, all of them playing in campus-site games, some of which were held prior to and some after the Montego Bay events.

Seven of the Division I teams traveled to Montego Bay. Four of them which had hosted campus-site games formed the Montego Bay Division and played in a pair of doubleheaders at Montego Bay, while the other three, each of which had played as the visitor in a campus-site game against one of the "hosts," formed the Rose Hall Division and took part in a round-robin competition at Montego Bay in which each played the other two "visitors" once.

After Florida State withdrew from the 2017 Puerto Rico Tip-Off to play in the Jamaica Classic, the Classic's organizers chose the showcase doubleheader format rather than a bracketed tournament between the four "hosts" to prevent Florida State and Tulane — already scheduled to meet in the Heritage Insurance Classic on December 10 — from meeting in the Jamaica Classic as well in violation of NCAA scheduling rules.

Participants 
 Colorado State
 Florida State
 Fordham
 Hartford
 LIU Brooklyn
 Miami (OH)
 Northwestern State
 The Citadel
 Tulane
 Winthrop
 Gordon College
 LeTourneau
 Oglethorpe
 Trinity Baptist

Campus Games

Montego Bay Division

Rose Hall Division 

Source

References

External links
Official site of the Jamaica Classic

College basketball competitions
Recurring sporting events established in 2017
Basketball in Jamaica
2017 establishments in Jamaica